Kaohsiung Arena is a station on the Red line of Kaohsiung MRT in Zuoying District, Kaohsiung, Taiwan. The station is named after the nearby Kaohsiung Arena.

The station is a two-level, underground station with an island platform and five exits. It is 215 metres long and is located at the intersection of Boai Road and Yucheng Road.

Around the station
Sanmin Home Economics & Commerce Vocational High School
Ruifeng Night Market
Kaohsiung Arena
Hanshin Department Store
Mingcheng Park
Arena Shopping Circle

References

External links
KRTC Kaohsiung Arena Station

2008 establishments in Taiwan
Kaohsiung Metro Red line stations
Railway stations opened in 2008